Pidgin English is a non-specific name used to refer to any of the many pidgin languages derived from English. Pidgins that are spoken as first languages become creoles.

English-based pidgins that became stable contact languages, and which have some documentation, include the following:

Aboriginal Pidgin English
Native American Pidgin English
Cameroonian Pidgin English
Chinese Pidgin English
Butler English (India)
Euro English
Ghanaian Pidgin English
Hawaiian Pidgin English
Japanese Bamboo English
Japanese Pidgin English
Korean Bamboo English
Kru Pidgin English
Liberian Interior Pidgin English
Micronesian Pidgin English
Nauru Pidgin English
New Zealand Pidgin English
Nigerian Pidgin
Papua New Guinea Pidgin
Papuan Pidgin English (distinct from Tok Pisin)
Port Jackson Pidgin English (ancestral to Australian Kriol)
Queensland Kanaka English
Samoan Plantation Pidgin
Solomon Islands Pijin
Solombala-English
Thai Pidgin English
Tok Pisin
West African Pidgin English (multiple varieties)
Vanuatu Bislama
Franglish

See also
 English-based creoles
 Macaronic languages
 World Englishes

References

English Pidgins